Sultan is a common title, which is often used as a name in several cultures.

Given name
Sultan Ali al-Arada (born 1959), Yemeni politician
Sultan Bahu (c. 1628 – 1691), Muslim Sufi and saint and Punjabi poet
Sultan Haydar (born 1985), Turkish female long-distance runner
Sultan Ibragimov (born 1975), Russian boxer
Sultan bin Mohammed Al Kabeer (born 1954), Saudi royal and businessman
Sultan Kösen (born 1982), Turkish World Guinness record holder for tallest living male
Sultan Ali Lakhani, Pakistani businessman
Sultan Bashiruddin Mahmood (born 1940), Pakistani engineer
Sultan Munadi (1976–2009) Afghan journalist
Sultan bin Khalifa Al Nahyan (born 1965), Emirati military officer, businessman and royal
Sultan Ahmad Nanupuri (1914–1997), Bangladeshi Islamic scholar and teacher
Sultan Rahi (born 1938), Pakistani film actor
Sultan bin Abdulaziz Al Saud (1928–2011), Saudi royal and government official
Sultan bin Abdullah Al Saud (born 1995), Saudi royal and businessman
Sultan bin Fahd Al Saud (born 1951), Saudi royal
Sultan Zarawani (born 1961), Emirati cricketer
Sultan (hip hop artist), mononym for a French hip hop artist

Surname
Ameer Sultan, Indian film director
Daniel Isom Sultan (1885–1947), American army general
Faris Al-Sultan, German triathlete
Grete Sultan, American pianist
Tipu Sultan (journalist) (born c. 1973), Bangladeshi journalist
Wafa Sultan, Syrian vocal critic of Islam

Arabic-language surnames
Arabic masculine given names
Turkish masculine given names
Arabic unisex given names
Bengali Muslim surnames